Mourad Ranene (born 6 January 1967) is a Tunisian former footballer. He competed in the men's tournament at the 1988 Summer Olympics.

References

External links
 
 

1967 births
Living people
Tunisian footballers
Tunisia international footballers
Olympic footballers of Tunisia
Footballers at the 1988 Summer Olympics
Place of birth missing (living people)
Association football forwards
CS Sfaxien players